Wyatt is a 2010 crime novel by Australian novelist Garry Disher which won the 2010 Ned Kelly Award. It is the seventh novel in the author's series of novels featuring the recurring character of Wyatt (no first name), a professional thief and burglar.

Interviews

 Jo Case, of Readings, interviewed the author on the release of the novel.
 Andrew Nette, of Pulp Curry interviewed the author about this book and the others in his series.

Reviews

 The Australian
 The Sydney Morning Herald

Awards and nominations

 2010 winner Ned Kelly Award

References 

2010 Australian novels
Australian crime novels
Ned Kelly Award-winning works